P. T. Selvakumar is an Indian film director, producer, marketing and PRO who has worked in the Tamil film industry.

Career
Selvakumar started his career as a journalist before becoming associated with film director S. A. Chandrasekhar, who later appointed Selvakumar as his son Vijay's press relations officer. Selvakumar briefly also forayed into production during 2003, financing T. P. Gajendran's family drama, Banda Paramasivam (2003), which was later remade in Hindi as Housefull 2 (2012).

Selvakumar began working on his first directorial venture in January 2012, when it was announced that he had decided to sign up four actors with Nakul, Shiva, Santhanam and Premji Amaren selected. Priyamani was also soon after reported to have joined the cast, but the film was not officially announced. In October 2012, the film re-emerged with a new cast featuring Vinay Rai, Aravind Akash and Sathyan alongside Premji, while Raai Laxmi played the film's lead actress. Based on The Hangover (2009), Selvakumar's Onbadhula Guru (2013) shooting started from October 2012 and was released in early 2013 to negative reviews. Rediff.com gave 2 out of 5 stating "The entire film is like a collection of comic scenes put together to make the audience laugh without much thought to the storyline".

In 2014, he began working on the production of Puli (2015) directed by Chimbu Deven and featuring Vijay in the lead role. The movie received negative reviews and became a box-office disaster. His next film is Pokkiri Raja (2016) released to mixed reviews.

Filmography
All films are in Tamil, unless otherwise noted.

As director

As producer

References

Living people
Film directors from Tamil Nadu
Film producers from Tamil Nadu
Tamil film directors
Tamil film producers
Year of birth missing (living people)
Place of birth missing (living people)